Sports in Mizoram plays an important part of the culture of Mizoram  and it plays a key role in development of the state. Football, Basketball and Volleyball are the more popular sports in the Indian state of Mizoram

Mizo Traditional Games
Insuknawr
Inkawibah
In-uilen
Sakei lem chan
Tira Mei Kaiah
In-arpa sual
In-hlovawm
In-hmawlhtepir
In-kukdeh
In-hawngbi
Inbuan
In-saihrui pawh

Bingte sai rawkah

Football

Mizoram Football Association (MFA) is the state governing body of football in Mizoram, India. It is affiliated with the All India Football Federation, the sports national governing body. Mizoram also has a state League called Mizoram Premier League. Aizawl FC plays in the I-League.

Basketball

Mizoram has the first professional league in India, the Mizoram Super League with six teams in it. The competition is conducted by the Mizoram Basketball Association.

Badminton
Mizoram has a professional league for Badminton called Mizoram Badminton League, Mizoram Badminton league is governed by Mizoram Badminton Association.

Golf

Mizoram has a golf course at Thenzawl which is 105 acres and comprises 18 holes.

Volleyball

The Mizoram Volleyball Association is operating the Pro-league which was started in 2016 with six men's team and three women's team.

Motorsport
Mizoram Motorsport Association (MiMSA)  13 riders participated in the  Suzuki Gixxer Cup and the JK Tyre National Racing Championship at the Kari Motor Speedway in Coimbatore. An annual racing competition is organized by Mizoram Motorsports Association in Tuirial Field annually towards the end of the year.

Weightlifting

The Mizoram Weightlifting Association plays a very active role in promoting weightlifting in Mizoram. Mizoram Weightlifter Jeremy Lalrinnunga became the first person from India to win a gold medal in the men's 62 kg categoryat the Youth Olympics.

Cricket
The Cricket Association of Mizoram has a cricket stadium on the outskirts of Mizoram, called Suaka Cricket Stadium. The Association, which was formed in 1992, has eight first division clubs and 24 second division clubs.

The Mizoram team entered the national cricket competitions in the 2018-19 season.

Boxing
Mizoram boxing association has a very good record in national and international boxing. Nutlai LalbiakkimaJenny R. L. and Zoramthanga (boxer), Lalrinsanga Tlau, who won the WBC World Youth Title in 2021, are some of the more famous boxers from Mizoram.

Sports venues in Mizoram

Indoor
Hawla Indoor Stadium Basketball and Contact Sports
Dengthuama Indoor Stadium Judo, Boxing, Volleyball, Badminton and Volleyball
Sazaikawn multi-purpose indoor stadium, Lunglei.
Mizoram Table Tennis Hall, Mission Veng
Vanlallawma Indoor Stadium
Boxing Hall, Ramhlun

Outdoor stadium
Rajiv Gandhi Stadium (Aizawl) For Athletics and Football
Lammual Football
Thenzawl Golf Course
Zobawk Sports Academy, Lunglei
Thuamluaia Mual - artificial turf in Lunglei for Football
Kawnpui Hockey ground - Artificial turf for Playing Hockey
Champhai Zotlang Sports Stadium - Artificial Turf ground in Champhai for Athletics and Football
Suaka Cricket Stadium- Sihhmui
Kolasib Sports Stadium, Venglai - Athletics and Football with artificial turf.
Serchhip Hmarveng Complex Field -Artificial turf football ground.
 Central YLA Playground, Lawngtlai - Artificial turf football ground.

References

Sport in Mizoram